Momo and the Time Thieves is a Danish-language opera in two acts by Svitlana Azarova.

The opera was commissioned by the Royal Danish Opera, Copenhagen, and written in 2015 and 2016; It was published by Donemus and was world premiered on 15 October 2017. It was rewarded with 5 stars from Politiken and Berlingske among others.

Conductor: 
Stage director: Elisabeth Linton
Scenography and costumes: Palle Steen Christensen
Lighting: Ulrik Gad
Choreographer: Sara Ekman
Dramaturg: Louise Nabe
Choir masters: Denis Segond and Ole Faurschou

Roles

Instrumentation
Woodwinds: piccolo, 2 flutes, 2 oboes, English horn, 2 clarinets in B-flat, bass clarinet in B-flat, 2 bassoons, contrabassoon
Brass: 4 horns in F, 3 trumpets in B-flat, 3 trombones, tuba
Percussion (3 players) 1: Suspended crotales in f#, wind chimes, timpani; 2: Suspended cymbal (right), piccolo snare, snare drum, 4 rototoms, Taiko/Buk (medium), bass drum; 3: Vibraphone, 4 tom-toms, Taiko/Buk (low), bass drum wind gong, big suspended thunder sheet
Strings: violins I, violins II, violas, violoncellos, double basses

Gallery

References

External links 
 Official Trailer
 Sheet music

2017 operas
Compositions by Svitlana Azarova
Danish-language operas
Operas
Operas based on novels
Operas by Svitlana Azarova